Indian Springs is a census-designated place (CDP) in Lincoln County, Montana, United States. The population was 31 at the 2010 census.

The CDP is located on U.S. Route 93.

Demographics

References

Census-designated places in Lincoln County, Montana
Census-designated places in Montana